Sir Joseph Ignatius Little (1835 14 July 1902) was a lawyer, politician, and judge in the Newfoundland Colony.

Biography
Little was born in Charlottetown, Prince Edward Island, the son of Cornelius Little and Brigid (née Costin). He was a lawyer by profession, and was called to the Newfoundland Bar in 1859. Elected to the Newfoundland and Labrador House of Assembly for Harbour Main in an 1867 by-election, he was attorney general 1870–75 in the cabinet of Charles Fox Bennett, and was a minister without portfolio in the cabinet of William Whiteway.

In 1883 he was appointed to the Supreme Court of Newfoundland, and became Chief Justice in 1898. He was knighted in the 1901 Birthday Honours list, effective from 19 December 1901.

Little died in office on 14 July 1902 in St John's, Newfoundland.

References

1835 births
1902 deaths
Canadian Knights Bachelor
Members of the Newfoundland and Labrador House of Assembly
Date of birth unknown
Canadian Roman Catholics
Canadian people of Irish descent
Newfoundland Colony judges
Attorneys-General of Newfoundland Colony